Entomopathogens are pathogens that infect insects. Entomopathogens include:

 Entomopathogenic fungus
 Entomopathogenic nematode
 Entomopathogenic virus
 Entomopathogenic bacterium

See also 
 Arbovirus
 List of insect-borne diseases